L’École de Physique des Houches (the Physics School of Les Houches) was founded in 1951 by a young French scientist, Cécile DeWitt-Morette.

Historically the first lessons were given in 1951 by Léon Van Hove  on quantum mechanics.  The conditions were very spartan with the lessons lasting eight weeks in alpine chalets devoid of all comforts, a few kilometers from the village of Les Houches.

Soon, the school rapidly attracted the greatest names of modern physics, such as Enrico Fermi, Wolfgang Pauli, Murray Gell-Mann and John Bardeen amongst others.  The young students, then unknown, included such future scientists as Pierre-Gilles de Gennes, Georges Charpak, and Claude Cohen-Tannoudji, all future winners of the Nobel prize for Physics, as well as mathematician Alain Connes, future winner of the Fields medal.

Summer school sessions

1990

July 1990 : quantum optics, non-linear optics and laser cooling 
 Director : Jean Zinn-Justin
 Coorganisers of the school : Jean Dalibard and Jean-Michel Raimond

Teachers 
 Rainer Blatt
 Claude Cohen-Tannoudji (Nobel Prize 1997)
 Claude Fabre
 Serge Haroche (Nobel Prize 2012)
 H. Jeff Kimble
 Daniel Kleppner
 Luigi Lugiato
 William D. Phillips (Nobel Prize 1997)
 Wolfgang Schleich
 Yuen-Ron Shen
 Jook Walraven

Visitors 
 Alain Aspect

Notable participants 
 Artur Ekert, Wolfson College, Oxford University, UK
 Daniel Hennequin Laboratoire de Spectroscopie Hertzienne, Université de Lille-Flandres-Artois, Villeneuve-d'Ascq, France
 Monika (Ritsch-)Marte, Institut für Theoretische Physik, University of Innsbruck, Austria
 Klaus Mølmer, Institute of Physics and Astronomy, Aarhus University, Denmark
 Olivier Pfister, Université Paris-Nord, Laboratoire de Physique des Lasers, France
 Michael Schubert, University of Hamburg, Institut fur Experimentalphysik, Germany
 Andrew Steane, Clarendon Laboratory, Oxford, UK
 Kalle-Antti Suominen, University of Helsinki, Research Institute for Theoretical Physics, Finland

1954

Teachers 
 Freeman Dyson
 Rudolf Peierls

1951 
 Participants :
 Claude Cohen-Tannoudji

References

External links
 École de Physique des Houches web site

Education in France
Summer schools
Physics education